C. spinosum  may refer to:
 Canthium spinosum, a flowering plant species in the genus Canthium
 Citharexylum spinosum, the spiny fiddlewood, a flowering plant species in the genus Citharexylum
 Crucibulum spinosum, the spiny cup-and-saucer snail, a sea snail species native to the west coast of the Americas, from California to Chile

Synonyms
 Catasetum spinosum, a synonym for Catasetum barbatum, the bearded catasetum, an orchid species
 Chamaeleo spinosum, a synonym for Rhampholeon spinosus, the rosette-nosed chameleon, a small East African lizard species

See also
 Spinosum